Mulavukad Grama Panchayat is grama panchayat in Ernakulam district, Kerala, India. It is situated in Vypin block panchayat. The major portion of this panchayat is an island with same name. It is situated some kilometres from Vypin island. The boundaries of the Mulvukad Panchayath are Kadamakkudy, Njarakkal Panchayaths in the North, Kochi Corporation in the East and South and Elangunnappuzha Panchayath in the West. This island is situated very near to Kochi city. Bolgatty Palace is a popular tourist attraction in the southern part of the island. This palace was built by Dutch in 1774. Now it is under the control of Department of Tourism, Government of Kerala.

History 
In the past, the people in this area were mainly engaged in the works in ships arriving at Kochi. Water was the only means of transport. But with the creation of the Gosree Bridge, the island's popularity has increased.

Economy 
In earlier time, people were employed on meager wages here. The main means of livelihood was to work in coir industry and work in ships.  But after the arrival of Cochin Port 80% of people got permanent jobs there. The companies like Tata Group centred there work at Kochi also created job opportunities in 19th and 20th centuries. Though this island was backward in industrial progression they worked for the industries in the mainland regions like Ernakulam. The arrival of Vallarpadam Container Terminal progressed the region industrially and economically. People also engaged in the cultivation of crops like paddy, vegetables, etc.

Culture

There are different cultural institutions working in this panchayat. Some of them are..
Samskarika Nilayam
Gramina Vayanasala
Abraham Madamakkal Memorial Library
Ponjikkara Library
Rachana cultural centre
AKG Library

Notable personalities 

There were different notable persons lived here like Ponjikkara Rafi, a Malayali writer and winner of Sahitya Akademi Award for his novel named Kaliyugam, Gasper De Silva who was an Anglo-Indian nominee in the legislative assembly of Kochi. He was also a member of Constitution Assembly of India in 1946. Abraham Madamakkal, an Indian freedom fighter and activist was also a notable person here.

Wards 
There are several wards in this panchayat including

 Panambukad North
 Mulavukad North
 Tower line
 Keralapuram
 Vattekkadu
 St. Mary's ward
 Hospital ward
 Thandassery Ward
 Water tank ward
 Ponnarimangalam
 Ponjikkara
 Bolgatty
 Vallarpadam
 T V Centre ward
 Adikandam
 Ambedkar village

Statistics

References

External links 

Vallarpadam termianal

Gram panchayats in Kerala